Fuencarral-El Pardo is one of the 21 districts that form the city of Madrid, Spain.

Overview
Fuencarral-El Pardo is the district number 8 and consists of the following neighborhoods: El Pardo (81), Fuentelarreina (82), Peñagrande (83), Pilar (84), La Paz (85), Valverde (86), Mirasierra (87) and El Goloso (88).

Despite its being a part of a capital city, El Pardo with its woods and river is an ecologically important landscape. It enjoyed protection from development as a hunting estate associated with the Royal Palace of El Pardo. In the 1980s the European Union designated the Monte de El Pardo as a Special Protection Area for bird-life.

Geography

Subdivision
The district is administratively divided into 8 wards (Barrios):
Barrio del Pilar
El Goloso
El Pardo
Fuentelarreina
La Paz
Mirasierra
Peñagrande
Valverde

Education

The new campus of the Deutsche Schule Madrid, in Montecarmelo (ES) in the district, opened in the fall of 2015.

See also
Fuencarral
Royal Palace of El Pardo

References

External links

 
Districts of Madrid